Robert Jacob Lewis (December 30, 1864 – July 24, 1933) was a Republican member of the U.S. House of Representatives from Pennsylvania.

Robert J. Lewis was born in Dover, Pennsylvania.  He attended the public schools of York, Pennsylvania and graduated from the high school in 1883.  He taught in the public schools until September 1889.  He graduated from the law department of Yale University in 1891 and was admitted to the New Haven, Connecticut, bar in June 1891 and to the bar of York County, Pennsylvania, August 1891.  He commenced practice in York. He was elected school controller of York in 1893 and reelected in 1897 and 1903.  He was elected city solicitor in 1895.  He was an unsuccessful candidate for election in 1898.

Lewis was elected as a Republican to the Fifty-seventh Congress. He declined to be a candidate for renomination in 1902.  He returned to the practice of law, and died in Camden, Arkansas, in 1933.  He remains were cremated and the ashes placed in the Iris Columbarium Mausoleum in St. Louis, Missouri.

Sources

The Political Graveyard

1864 births
1933 deaths
Pennsylvania lawyers
Politicians from York, Pennsylvania
Yale Law School alumni
Republican Party members of the United States House of Representatives from Pennsylvania